The Hum Lug-Gornja Stubica railway, officially designated as the L202 railway, is a 10.823 km (6.725 mi) railway line of local significance in Croatia that connects corridor's east terminus Gornja Stubica, along with the halts Donja Stubica, Stubičke Toplice and Oroslavje, with the R201 railway corridor (Zaprešić-Čakovec) in Hum Lug. The line is today used for passenger (local) transport exclusively.

The line, opened in 1916 in former Kingdom of Croatia-Slavonia (present-day Croatia), is single-tracked and non-electrified. Trains that operate on this line have their roughly 15 minutes run between stations Gornja Stubica and Zabok, using the corridor R201 for about 2 kilometers between Hum Lug and Zabok, where connections with the trains running on R201 and R106 (Zabok-Krapina-Đurmanec-state border with Slovenia) corridors are made.

Introduction of diesel-motor trains on the route began in the second half of 1980's and from early 1990's they have been operating passenger services exclusively (mostly HŽ series 7121), replacing compositions made of two-axle cars powered by steam and later diesel locomotives.

References 

Railway lines in Croatia
Krapina-Zagorje County
Railway lines opened in 1916
1916 establishments in Croatia